Chiaureli is a Georgian surname. Notable people with the surname include:

Mikheil Chiaureli (1894–1974), Soviet Georgian film director
Sofiko Chiaureli (1937–2008), Soviet Georgian actress, daughter of Mikheil Chiaureli

Georgian-language surnames